Karabayevo (Qarabay) is a rural locality (a village) in Kainlykovsky Selsoviet, Burayevsky District, Bashkortostan, Russia. The population was 239 as of 2010. There are 2 streets.

Geography 
Karabayevo is located 25 km southwest of Burayevo (the district's administrative centre) by road. Biginyayevo is the nearest rural locality.

References 

Rural localities in Burayevsky District